Luís Teotónio Pereira (17 March 1895 – 13 February 1990) was a Portuguese politician and diplomat. He was born in Lisbon, Sagrado Coração de Jesus.

Early life
Luis' father was João Teotónio Pereira, Jr. (Lisbon, 1869 - Lisbon, São Domingos de Benfica, 1948), Administrator of the Companhia de Seguros Fidelidade, and his mother Virgínia Hermann von Boetischer (Lisbon, Santa Engrácia, 1871 - Lisbon, 1969). Their children were Luis' younger brother, Pedro Teotónio Pereira, also a Politician and a Diplomat.  His maternal grandfather was the Prussian Maximilian August Hermann von Boetischer, an Engineer who is linked to the installation of the telephones in Portugal.

Career

Personal life
He married Alice de Azevedo Gomes de Bettencourt (Angra do Heroísmo, Sé Catedral, 31 December 1895 – Lisbon, Lapa, 11 June 1957) at the Estrela Basilica in Lisbon on 17 December 1919. They had six children. Pereira also qualified on a Course of Painting (Watercolor painting) with Alfredo Roque Gameiro, daughter of Severiano de Bettencourt and wife Maria Adelaide de Ávila Gomes.

References

External links
 Luís Teotónio Pereira's genealogy in a Portuguese Genealogical site

1895 births
1990 deaths
Legislators in Portugal
Mayors of places in Portugal
People from Lisbon
Portuguese people of German descent